The following television stations broadcast on digital or analog channel 31 in Mexico:

 XET-TDT in Monterrey, Nuevo León
 XHCCT-TDT in Ciudad del Carmen, Campeche 
 XHCTCJ-TDT in Ciudad Juárez, Chihuahua
 XHDH-TDT in Mérida, Yucatán 
 XHDL-TDT in Mazatlán, Sinaloa 
 XHGC-TDT in Mexico City
 XHGJE-TDT in Jerécuaro, Guanajuato 
 XHGSA-TDT in Salvatierra, Guanajuato 
 XHHLO-TDT in Huajuapan de León, Oaxaca 
 XHHMA-TDT in Hermosillo, Sonora 
 XHIC-TDT in Perote, Veracruz de Ignacio de la Llave
 XHIGN-TDT in Iguala, Guerrero
 XHLBN-TDT in Tepic, Nayarit 
 XHLGG-TDT in León, Guanajuato
 XHLRM-TDT in Los Reyes Salgado, Michoacán de Ocampo
 XHLVZ-TDT in Zacatecas, Zacatecas
 XHMIS-TDT in Los Mochis, Sinaloa 
 XHMOS-TDT in Moctezuma, Sonora
 XHNCI-TDT in Manzanillo, Colima
 XHNSS-TDT in Nogales, Sonora 
 XHPET-TDT in Puerto Escondido, Oaxaca
 XHPNH-TDT in Piedras Negras, Coahuila
 XHSCE-TDT in Saltillo, Coahuila
 XHSFJ-TDT in Guadalajara, Jalisco 
 XHSLA-TDT in San Luis Potosí, San Luis Potosí
 XHSPB-TDT in La Paz, Baja California Sur
 XHSPROS-TDT in Ciudad Obregón, Sonora
 XHSPRTC-TDT in Tuxtla Gutierrez, Chiapas
 XHTCL-TDT in Calpulalpan, Tlaxcala 
 XHTK-TDT in Ciudad Victoria, Tamaulipas
 XHUBT-TDT in La Venta, Tabasco
 XHVPA-TDT in Villa Pesqueira, Sonora

31